Timo Askolin is the head coach of Allianssi Vantaa football club, a Finnish football club from Vantaa.

References

1951 births
Living people
Finnish football managers
FC Inter Turku managers
Atlantis FC managers